The Juilliard School is a private performing arts conservatory in New York City. Established in 1905 as the Institute of Musical Art, the school became the Juilliard School of Music in 1946 and was subsequently renamed the Juilliard School with music, dance, and drama programs. It is widely regarded as one of the most elite performing arts schools in the world.

Located at the Lincoln Center for Performing Arts, the school has a total enrollment of about 950 undergraduates and graduates in dance, drama, and music, and also trains students in the Pre-College Division. It has several student and faculty ensembles that perform throughout the year, most notably the Juilliard String Quartet. A Board of Trustees manages the school with an approximate $1 billion endowment.

Prominent alumni of Juilliard have garnered more than 105 Grammy Awards, 62 Tony Awards, 47 Emmy Awards, and 24 Academy Awards. Many Juilliard musicians have gone on to become internationally successful virtuosos. Juilliard alumni include more than 16 Pulitzer Prize and 12 National Medal of Arts recipients, Gramophone Classical Music Awards and  Polar Music Prize awardees, cultural ambassadors, and American Academy of Arts and Sciences members.

History

Early years: 1905-1946 

In 1905, the Institute of Musical Art (IMA), Juilliard's predecessor institution, was founded by Frank Damrosch, a German-American conductor and godson of Franz Liszt, on the premise that the United States did not have a premier music school and too many students were going to Europe to study music. Chartered by the Board of Regents of the University of the State of New York, the institute became the first endowed music school in the US, with significant funding provided by philanthropist and banker James Loeb. 

Damrosch and Loeb’s mission was to establish a musical institution with high standards of teaching and learning that would incorporate a unified pedagogy and develop a "true musical culture among all classes". Accordingly, the school would rely on its endowment to ensure the quality of instruction was independent of students’ financial status. 

The Institute of Musical Art opened in the former Lenox Mansion, Fifth Avenue and 12th Street, on October 11, 1905. When the school opened, most teachers were European; however, only Americans were allowed to study at the institute. Although orchestras were exclusively male, women made up most of the student population. The school had 467 students in the first year, but the enrollment soon doubled in size over the following years. Five years after its inception, the institute moved to 120 Claremont Avenue in the Morningside Heights neighborhood of Manhattan onto a property purchased from Bloomingdale Insane Asylum near the Columbia University campus.

In 1919, a wealthy textile merchant named Augustus Juilliard died and left a vast sum of money to advance music in his will, which set up the Juilliard Musical Foundation (JMF) a year later as one of its primary beneficiaries.  Under Eugene Noble as executive secretary, the foundation purchased the Vanderbilt family guesthouse at 49 E. 52nd Street, and established a separate new music school, the Juilliard Graduate School (JGS), in 1924.

After much discussion, the Juilliard School of Music was eventually created in 1926 through a merger of the Institute and the Graduate School. The JGS moved from E 52nd Street to 130 Claremont Avenue next to the IMA in 1931. The two schools had the same board of directors and president but maintained their distinct identities. Columbia University Professor John Erskine became the first president of the two institutions (1928-1937). Frank Damrosch continued as the Institute's dean, and the Australian pianist and composer Ernest Hutcheson was appointed dean of the Graduate School. Hutcheson later served as president from 1937 to 1945.

Expansion and growth: 1946-1990 

Juilliard's third president, William Schuman, an American composer and the first Pulitzer Prize for Music winner, led the school from 1945 to 1961 and brought about several significant changes to raise the school's academic standards. In 1946, Schuman completely consolidated the Institute of Musical Art and the Juilliard Graduate School to form a single institution and created the Juilliard String Quartet as a resident ensemble that quickly gained international acclaim.  During his tenure, Schuman cut down enrollment by more than half, eliminated the Juilliard Summer School and Music Education Program, and opened Juilliard's admission to non-Americans.  

Schuman discontinued the Theory Department and initiated a new curriculum called the Literature and Materials of Music (L&M), which began in 1947-1948, and was based on the assumption that musical theory education "should transfer theoretical knowledge into practical performance." Designed for composers to teach, the more practical-orientated curriculum would provide an overview of the "literature of music."   L&M was a reaction against more formal theory and ear training, and as a result did not have a formal structure and allowed for more flexibility.

Schuman established the school's Dance Department under Martha Hill's direction in 1951, intending that students in the program would receive an education in dance, choreography, and music. The department, later renamed the Dance Division, offered performance opportunities through the Juilliard Dance Theatre (1954-1958) and later the Juilliard Dance Ensemble (founded c. 1960), which often collaborated with the Juilliard Orchestra. For many years, the Juilliard Dance Department shared facilities with the School of American Ballet.   

In 1957 after two years of deliberation, the Juilliard School of Music board announced that the school would relocate from upper Manhattan to the future Lincoln Center. The Lincoln Center would cover the costs for the construction project, but the school would have to instruct exclusively advanced students, introduce a drama program and cut its Preparatory School. Juilliard's new building at Lincoln Center would be designed by Pietro Belluschi with associates Eduardo Catalano and Helge Westermann. The Juilliard School building at Lincoln Center was completed on October 26, 1969, officially opening with a dedication ceremony and concert.
With Lincoln Center's prestige came a newly elevated status for the Juilliard School.
 

William Schuman assumed the presidency of Lincoln Center in 1962 and composer Peter Mennin succeeded him. Mennin made substantial changes to the L&M program—ending ear training and music history, adding performances and composition in class, and hiring the well-known pedagogue Renée Longy to teach solfège. Mennin organized several new programs, such as Juilliard's Master Class Program and Doctoral Music Program. Under Mennin, Juilliard's international reputation increased as the school produced numerous prominent alumni.

In 1968, Mennin hired John Houseman to manage the new Drama Division as director and Michel Saint-Denis as associate director and consultant. The School's name was changed to The Juilliard School to reflect its broadened mission to educate musicians, dancers, directors, and actors. The drama department first only trained actors, of which the first class graduated as Group 1 in 1972, but added playwrights and directors programs in the 1990s. Houseman founded The Acting Company in 1972, which allowed Juilliard students to perform and tour throughout the country. Also, in 1972, Lila Acheson Wallace donated $5 million to Juilliard, which later named the Lila Acheson Wallace American Playwrights Program after her.

Modernization: 1990-2020 
Juilliard's longest-serving president Joseph W. Polisi (1984-2017), helped the school modernize by developing educational outreach, formalizing and expanding its music programs, establishing interdisciplinary programs and reforming the school's finances. In 1991, Polisi founded the Music Advancement Program (MAP) to help underrepresented students affected by music education budget cuts throughout public schools in New York.  Between 1990 and 1993, individual departments for all instruments and voice were established, the Merideth Wilson Residence Hall was built next to the school, salaries for teachers were increased, and the school hoped to accept fewer people and eventually cut 100 students to allow for more funding. In 2001, the school established a jazz performance training program.

The Juilliard School was awarded the National Medal of Arts in 1999.

In September 2005, Colin Davis conducted an orchestra that combined students from the Juilliard and London's Royal Academy of Music at the BBC Proms, and during 2008 the Juilliard Orchestra embarked on a successful tour of China, performing concerts as part of the Cultural Olympiad in Beijing, Suzhou, and Shanghai under the expert leadership of Maestro Xian Zhang.

The school has received various gifts and donations since the 2000s. In 2006, Juilliard obtained a trove of precious music manuscripts from board chair and philanthropist Bruce Kovner that make up the Juilliard Manuscript Collection. Philanthropist James S. Marcus donated $10 million to the school to establish the Ellen and James S. Marcus Institute for Vocal Arts at the school in 2010. In 2014, Kovner gave $60 million for the Kovner Fellowship Program to provide expesnses for exceptionally gifted students.  

On September 28, 2015, the Juilliard School announced a major expansion into Tianjin during a visit by China's first lady, Peng Liyuan, the institution's first such full-scale foray outside the United States. The school opened in 2020 and offers a Master of Music degree program.

In May 2017, retired New York City Ballet principal dancer Damian Woetzel was named president, replacing Joseph W. Polisi. From March 2020 through the spring 2021 semester, the school switched to online classes and suspended live performances in response to the COVID-19 pandemic.

Post-pandemic: 2020-present 
In June 2021, members of the student group The Socialist Penguins organized a protest against rising tuition costs after claiming that they "weren't being listened to" when meeting with president and provost about the tuition fees. In September, the school's Evening Division was renamed to Juilliard Extension which would broaden to offer programs in person and online. In December of the same year, a $50 million gift was given to the school's Music Advancement Program to help students of underrepresented backgrounds.

Campus
{
"type": "FeatureCollection",
  "features": [

{
    "type": "Feature", "properties": 
        { 
           "title": "Alice Tully Hall",
            "marker-symbol": "-number", 
            "marker-color": "302060", 
            "marker-size": "medium"
        }, 
    "geometry": 
        { 
            "type": "Point",
            "coordinates": [-73.98255267162323, 40.77338364167763] 
        }
        
},

{
"type": "Feature", "properties": 
        { 
           "title": "Juillliard School, Irene Diamond Building",
           "marker-symbol": "-number", 
            "marker-color": "302060", 
            "marker-size": "medium"
        }, 
    "geometry": 
        { 
            "type": "Point",
            "coordinates": [-73.98328267162323,40.7738036] 
        }
},
{
"type": "Feature", "properties": 
        { 
        "title": "Meredith Willson Residence Hall",
            "marker-symbol": "-number", 
            "marker-color": "302060", 
            "marker-size": "medium"
        }, 
    "geometry": 
        { 
            "type": "Point",
            "coordinates": [-73.98408267162323,40.7740036] 
        }
}
]
}

The Juilliard School occupies a single main building, the Irene Diamond Building, in the Lincoln Center for Performing Arts, along Broadway and W 65th Street. The Juilliard building contains several large studio rooms and performance venues, such as the Glorya Kaufman Dance Studio, Stephanie P. McClelland Drama Theater, Harold and Mimi Steinberg Drama Studio, the Judith Harris and Tony Woolfson Orchestral Studio, and Edwin and Nancy Marks Jazz Rehearsal Room. Recital halls include the Peter Jay Sharp Theater, Paul Recital Hall, and the Morse Recital Hall. The building also houses the Alice Tully Hall, where the Chamber Music Society of the Lincoln Center performs. 

Adjacent to the Juilliard building is the Samuel B. & David Rose Building, which is the home of the school's Meredith Willson Residence Hall, named after the composer, conductor and Juilliard alumni Meredith Willson. The hall consists of student dormitories, faculty suits, and studios for visiting artists.

Organization and Administration

Juilliard’s leadership and administration consist of a Board of Trustees, Executive officers, and senior administrators. The Board of Trustees includes approximately thirty members, with a chair and two vice-chairs, and is responsible for appointing Juilliard’s president and managing the school’s business affairs. Executive offices include the offices of the president and provost. Four administrators serve each as dean and director of the dance, music, drama, and preparatory divisions. There is an additional director for the Jazz program. Other academic subdivisions include the Ellen and James S. Marcus Institute for Vocal Arts and Lila Acheson Wallace Library. The vice president holds the position of Chief Advancement Officer and manages the development of the school. Other administrative areas include the Chief Operating Officer and Corporate Secretary, the Public Affairs Office, and Enrollment Management and Student Development.

The Juilliard School has ties with higher education institutions such as Barnard College, Columbia University, and Fordham University and has associations with Nord Anglia Education for primary and secondary education since 2015. The school is accredited by the Middle States Commission on Higher Education (MSCHE), with its last reaffirmation in 2020.

Academics

Admission
Juilliard admits both degree program seekers and pre-college division students. The latter enter a conservatory program for younger students to develop their skills; All applicants who wish to enroll in the Music Advancement Program, for the Pre-College Division, must perform an audition in person before members of the faculty and administration and must be between ages 8 and 18.

The Juilliard admissions program comprises several distinct steps. Applicants must submit a complete application, school transcripts, and recommendations; some majors also require that applicants submit prescreening recordings of their work, which are evaluated as part of the application. A limited number of applicants are then invited to a live audition, sometimes with additional callbacks. After auditions, the school invites select applicants to meet with a program administrator.

Admission to the Juilliard School is highly competitive. In 2007, the school received 2,138 applications for admission, of which 162 were admitted for a 7.6% acceptance rate. For the fall semester of 2009, the school had an 8.0% acceptance rate. In 2011, the school accepted 5.5% of applicants. For Fall 2012, 2,657 undergraduate applicants were received by the college division and 7.2% were accepted. The 75th percentile accepted into Juilliard in 2012 had a GPA of 3.96 and an SAT score of 1350.

A cross-registration program is available with Columbia University where Juilliard students who are accepted to the program are able to attend Columbia classes, and vice versa. The program is highly selective, admitting 10-12 students from Juilliard per year. Columbia students also have the option of pursuing an accelerated Master of Music degree at Juilliard and obtaining a bachelor's degree at Barnard or Columbia and an MM from Juilliard in five (or potentially six, for voice majors) years.

Academic programs

The school offers courses in dance, drama, and music.

The Dance Division was established in 1951 by William Schuman with Martha Hill as its director. It offers a Bachelor of Fine Arts or a Diploma. Areas of study include ballet and modern and contemporary dance, with courses ranging from dance technique and performance to dance studies. Since its inception, the dance program has had a strong emphasis not only on performance but also on choreography and collaboration.

The Drama Division was established in 1968 by the actor John Houseman and Michel Saint-Denis. Its acting programs offer a Bachelor of Fine Arts, a Diploma and, beginning in Fall 2012, a Master of Fine Arts. Until 2006, when James Houghton became director of the Drama Division, there was a "cut system" that would remove up to one-third of the second-year class. The Lila Acheson Wallace American Playwrights Program, begun in 1993, offers one-year, tuition-free, graduate fellowships; selected students may be offered a second-year extension and receive an Artist Diploma. The Andrew W. Mellon Artist Diploma Program for Theatre Directors was a two-year graduate fellowship that began in 1995 (expanded to three years in 1997); this was discontinued in the fall of 2006.

The Music Division is the largest of the school's divisions. Available degrees are Bachelor of Music or Diploma, Master of Music or Graduate Diploma, Artist Diploma and Doctor of Musical Arts. Academic majors are brass, collaborative piano, composition, guitar, harp, historical performance, jazz studies, orchestral conducting, organ, percussion, piano, strings, voice, and woodwinds. The largest music department is Juilliard's string department, followed by the piano department. The collaborative piano, historical performance, and orchestral conducting programs are solely at the graduate level; the opera studies and music performance subprograms only offer Artist Diplomas. The Juilliard Vocal Arts department now incorporates the former Juilliard Opera Center.

All Bachelor and Master courses require credits from the Liberal Arts course; Joseph W. Polisi is a member of the Liberal Arts faculty.

The school's non-degree diploma programs are for specialized training to advance a performer's professional career. These include undergraduate and graduate programs in dance, drama, and music. Musicians and performers can also complete Artist Diploma programs in jazz studies, performance, opera, playwriting, and string quartet studies.

Pre-College Division
The Pre-College Division teaches students enrolled in elementary, junior high, and high school. The Pre-College Division is conducted every Saturday from September to May in the Juilliard Building at Lincoln Center.

All students study solfège and music theory in addition to their primary instrument. Vocal majors must also study diction and performance. Similarly, pianists must study piano performance. String, brass and woodwind players, as well as percussionists, also participate in orchestra. The pre-college has two orchestras, the Pre-College Symphony (PCS) and the Pre-College Orchestra (PCO). Placement is by age and students may elect to study conducting, chorus, and chamber music.

The Pre-College Division began as the Preparatory Centers (later the Preparatory Division), part of the Institute of Musical Art since 1916. The Pre-College Division was established in 1969 with Katherine McC. Ellis as its first director. Olegna Fuschi served as director from 1975 to 1988. The Fuschi/Mennin partnership allowed the Pre-College Division to thrive, affording its graduates training at the highest artistic level (with many of the same teachers as the college division), as well as their own commencement ceremony and diplomas. In addition to Fuschi, directors of Juilliard's Pre-College Division have included composer Dr. Andrew Thomas. The current director of the Pre-College Division is Yoheved Kaplinsky.

Center for Innovation in the Arts
The Center for Innovation in the Arts (CIA), formerly called the Music Technology Center, at the Juilliard School was created in 1993 to provide students with the opportunity to use digital technology in the creation and performance of new music. Since then, the program has expanded to include a wide offering of classes such as, Introduction to Music Technology, Music Production, Film scoring, Computers In Performance and an Independent Study In Composition.

In 2009, the Music Technology Center moved to a new, state of the art facility that includes a mix and record suite and a digital "playroom" for composing and rehearsing with technology. Together with the Willson Theater, the Center for Innovation in the Arts is the home of interdisciplinary and electro-acoustic projects and performances at the Juilliard School.

Instruments

The Juilliard School has about 275 pianos, of which 231 are Steinway grand pianos. It is one of the world's largest collections of Steinway and Son's Pianos in the space of concert halls and practice rooms.

Pipe organs at Juilliard include those by Holtkamp (III/57, III/44, II/7), Schoenstein (III/12), Flentrop (II/17), Noack (II/3) and Kuhn (IV/85), which are located in various practice rooms and recital halls.

The strings department allows students to borrow valuable historic stringed instruments for special concerts and competitions. There are more than 200 such stringed instruments, including several by Antonio Stradivari and Giuseppi Guarneri del Gesù.

Print and digital resources

The Lila Acheson Wallace Library is the main library at Juilliard that holds study scores, performance and sound recordings, books, and videos. The school's archives include manuscript collections with digitized holographs. The library has over 87,000 musical scores and 25,000 sound recordings. The Peter Jay Sharp Special Collections features the Igor and Soulima Stravinsky Collection, the Arthur Gold and Robert Fizdale Collection, and the Eugène Ysaÿe Collection.

Juilliard's most notable collection is the Juilliard Manuscript Collection, which the school acquired in 2006. The collection includes autograph scores, sketches, composer-emended proofs and first editions of major works by Mozart, Bach, Beethoven, Brahms, Schumann, Chopin, Schubert, Liszt, Ravel, Stravinsky, Copland, and other masters of the classical music canon. Many of the manuscripts had been unavailable for generations. Among the items are the printer's manuscript of Beethoven's Ninth Symphony, complete with Beethoven's handwritten amendments, that was used for the first performance in Vienna in 1824; Mozart's autograph of the wind parts of the final scene of The Marriage of Figaro; Beethoven's arrangement of his monumental Große Fuge for piano four hands; Schumann's working draft of his Symphony No. 2; and manuscripts of Brahms's Symphony No. 2 and Piano Concerto No. 2. The entire collection has since been digitized and can be viewed online.

Rankings

Juilliard consistently ranks as one of the top performing arts schools in the world. Since QS first published its QS World University Rankings for the subject performing arts in 2016, Juilliard held the top spot as the best academic institution for performing arts for six years. The school only dropped its ranking to third place in 2022, falling behind the Royal College of Music and the University of Music and Performing Arts Vienna. As part of Juilliard's ranking criteria for 2022, the school had a perfect score of 100 for academic reputation and a 69.2 for employer reputation for an overall score of 93.8. Juilliard and the Curtis Institute of Music were the only two American conservatories that made the top 10 in the 2022 QS World Rankings in performing arts. In another report, The Hollywood Reporter described Juilliard as the "most elite of institutions" and ranked it as the best drama school in the world in 2021. According to the Hollywood Reporter's 2022 ranking of the best music schools in the world, Julliard ranked fourth.

Student life

Student body and diversity

The Juilliard School enrolled 492 full-time undergraduates, 114 part-time undergraduates and 374 graduate students as of the 2019-2020 school year. Women made up 47% of all the students enrolled. The retention rate for that academic year was 94%. That same year, Juilliard awarded 116 Bachelor's Degrees and 140 Master's Degrees and had a graduation rate of 94%. Of the undergraduate degrees, 87 were in music, 20 in dance, and nine in drama. The school conferred 132 Master of Music Degrees and eight Master of Fine Arts Degrees in drama.

Juilliard has made efforts to diversify its student body and program. In 2001, the conservatory introduced a Jazz Studies Program, which Wynton Marsalis currently directs. The school launched an Equity, Diversity, Inclusion, and Belonging (EDIB) initiative in 2018, which includes a task force and provides workshops for all faculty and staff. Student Diversity Initiatives provide students forums and activities to educate the community on diversity, internationalism, culture and social justice. In the same year, Alicia Graf Mack, who previously danced with the Dance Theatre of Harlem, became the school's first black dance director. The school has recently invested in funding for minority students and schoolchildren to address inequalities.

Student organizations

The Juilliard Black Student Union (JBSU) was founded in the fall of 2016. A group of students established the Alliance for Latin American & Spanish Students (ALAS) in the summer of 2018. The political organization, the Socialist Penguins, was created in 2021 to encourage "anti-capitalist and anti-racist discussions." Other Juilliard clubs include the Juilliard Chinese Student & Scholars Association (J-CSSA), the Juilliard Christian Fellowship (JCF) and the Juilliard Green Club, among others. Juilliard does not have any fraternities or sororities.

In the 1980s, Juilliard students assembled an ice hockey team called the Fighting Penguins to compete against a faculty team. The naming of the teams became the first usage of the penguin as the school's mascot. Later in the 1980s, the school had several running and racing events and a tennis team from the 1970s to 1990s. Today, there is a faculty-staff softball team and the student Juilliard Volleyball Club. However, no varsity teams play for the school.

Performing ensembles

The Juilliard School has a variety of ensembles, including chamber music, jazz, orchestras, and vocal/choral groups. Juilliard's orchestras include the Juilliard Orchestra, the Juilliard Chamber Orchestra, the Wind Orchestra, the New Juilliard Ensemble, the Juilliard Theatre Orchestra, and the Conductors' Orchestra. The Axiom Ensemble is a student directed and managed group dedicated to well-known 20th-century works.

Established in 2003, the Juilliard Electric Ensemble allows all students to use multi-media technology to produce and perform works. The ensemble has performed works that incorporate new technology by many contemporary composers.

In addition, Juilliard resident ensembles, which feature faculty members, perform frequently at the school. These groups include the Juilliard String Quartet and the American Brass Quintet, which are leading American ensembles that perform throughout the United States and abroad.

Notable people

Alumni

Over the years, Julliard alumni have contributed significantly to the arts and culture. Collectively, they have won numerous awards nationally and internationally, including more than 300 Grammy, Oscar, Emmy, and Tony Awards. Juilliard alumni include principal players and concertmasters of several major orchestras in the country. Other graduates have led international careers as soloists, playing with orchestras worldwide. Juilliard alumni are the recipients of over 16 Pulitzer Prizes and 12 National Medals of Arts. Alumni have represented the United States as cultural ambassadors for the arts and include U.N. messengers of peace.

Faculty

References

Further reading 
 Ten Years of American Opera Design at the Juilliard School of Music, published by New York Public Library, 1941.
 The Juilliard Report on Teaching the Literature and Materials of Music, by Juilliard School of Music. Published by Norton, 1953.
 The Juilliard Review, by Richard Franko Goldman, published by Juilliard School of Music, 1954.
 The Juilliard Journal, published by the Juilliard School, 1985.
 Nothing But the Best: The Struggle for Perfection at the Juilliard School, by Judith Kogan. Published by Random House, 1987. .
 Guide to the Juilliard School Archives, by Juilliard School Archives, Jane Gottlieb, Stephen E. Novak, Taras Pavlovsky. Published by The School, 1992.
 Juilliard: A History, by Andrea Olmstead. Published by University of Illinois Press, 2002, .
 A Living Legacy: Historic Stringed Instruments at the Juilliard School, by Lisa Brooks Robinson, Itzhak Perlman. Amadeus Press, 2006. .

External links

 
 The Juilliard School – its history at 100
 Andrea Olmstead papers, 1970–2013 Music Division, The New York Public Library. Olmstead's papers hold the research she carried out for her book on Juilliard, and include recorded interviews with various faculty, former students, and staff.

 
Schools of the performing arts in the United States
1905 establishments in New York City
Dance schools in the United States
Diller Scofidio + Renfro buildings
Drama schools in the United States
Educational institutions established in 1905
Lincoln Center
Music schools in New York City
Music schools in New York (state)
United States National Medal of Arts recipients
Universities and colleges in Manhattan
Cultural history of New York City
Dance in New York City
Private universities and colleges in New York City
Private universities and colleges in New York (state)
Culture of Manhattan